Mayapuri (Hindi: मायापुरी)  is the oldest and largest circulated Hindi magazine weekly in India, with a circulation figure of over 3,40,000 per week and a readership of 30,60,000. It was first published in 1974 by the publication group also known by the same name i.e. Mayapuri Group.

Mayapuri Group
Mayapuri Group of publications began more than 100 years ago, in 1882, in Lahore, the capital of undivided Punjab by the name of Arorbans Press. The group later shifted its head office to Delhi. After partition, the torchbearer of this group, A.P Bajaj, took the group to new heights by making innovations in the field of media by expanding his printing facilities and launching first children’s magazine Lotpot, which proved to be a big success.

Mayapuri magazine
In 1974, the Mayapuri Group launched the first weekly Hindi film magazine Mayapuri of India, which proved to be a big success. It has been one of the most popular Hindi magazines, covering Bollywood, since its inception and is most sought after film-gossip magazine in northern Hindi belt of India. "Mayapuri" also finds mention in the 2008 Bollywood film Ghajini and the popular Star One teen drama series Miley Jab Hum Tum. One could find this Mayapuri (Hindi) magazine at any barber shop in India, a glossy magazine full of filmy gossips. Some of the old issues of decades of 1970–80s are considered as vintage.

English Version 
An english version was created called Bollyy.

References

External links
 Mayapuri, bollywood and bhojpuri film online magazine
 Mayapuri, film and television weekly, digital edition

1974 establishments in Delhi
Hindi-language magazines
Film magazines published in India
Weekly magazines published in India
Online magazines published in India
Magazines established in 1974
Magazines published in Delhi
Television magazines